Colonel Maxwell Charles Gordon Meighen, OBE (June 5, 1908 – February 5, 1992) was a Canadian financier and the son of Canadian Prime Minister Arthur Meighen.

Life and career
Meighen was born in Portage la Prairie, Manitoba. He graduated from the Royal Military College and the University of Toronto. He served in World War II with the Corps of Royal Canadian Electrical and Mechanical Engineers in Europe and retired with the rank of Colonel. He then took over the investment companies founded by his father.

In 1961, as chairman and director of Canadian General Investments Ltd., he entered the consortium of financiers, headed by Bud McDougald, that owned the Argus Corporation. As an Argus director, he was also a member of the boards of some of the largest Canadian companies, including Domtar, Massey Ferguson, Dominion Stores and Hollinger Mines.

Meighen resigned from Argus in 1978 when it was taken over by Conrad Black, Montegu Black and Hal Jackman. He later became chairman and director of Canadian General Investments.

Meighen died in Toronto in 1992.

References

External links
 "Maxwell Charles Gordon Meighen". The Canadian Encyclopedia

Maxwell Meighen
1908 births
1992 deaths
Businesspeople from Ontario
Canadian military personnel of World War II
Canadian people of Ulster-Scottish descent
Children of prime ministers of Canada
People from Portage la Prairie
Royal Military College of Canada alumni
University of Toronto alumni
Canadian Officers of the Order of the British Empire
Canadian people of Scottish descent